Deseado Department is a department in Santa Cruz Province, Argentina. It has a population of 72,953 (2001) and an area of 63,784 km². The seat of the department is in Puerto Deseado.

Municipalities
 Caleta Olivia
 Cañadón Seco
 Fitz Roy
 Jaramillo
 Koluel Kayke
 Pampa Alta
 Tres Cerros
 Las Heras
 Pico Truncado
 Puerto Deseado
 Tellier

References
Instituto Nacional de Estadísticas y Censos, INDEC

Departments of Santa Cruz Province, Argentina